Bala Pyan (born Saw Nan Shwe; 27 June 1914 – 1987) was a 20th-century Burmese Aka Weizza who invented the Sandawgyein Aka. She was believed to be the reincarnation of Aung Bala, who was also a dancer.

Early life
She became interested in singing and dancing, and began learning traditional dance under Shwegon, a myay wine dancer, as well as from Ba Maung, a zat saya, and his wife Zawbyan in Mandalay.

Career as a dancer
She started performing alongside Burma Sein and Naypyidaw Ba Thet when she was sixteen. The Saopha of Hsipaw, Sao Kya Ohn, recognized her performance in the kinnara by awarding her, along with Bo Kay Sein, two silver swords and a silver bowl.

She was honored with a gold medal and the title of Aka Weizza by Colonel Tun Sein of the socialist government for introducing a new dance into yoke thé shows in which the dancers imitated the movements of the marionettes. In 1969–1970 she introduced the Sandawgyein with partner Sein Aung Min.

Later years
Her final partner was Pantya Kyi Lin. She tutored at the Ministry of Culture in the cultural department and performed the bird-crooning dance in kinnara yein, raising the standard for yein dance. Along with Shwe Man Tin Maung and Sein Aung Min, she was sent on cultural exchange tours to China and Vietnam.

She died in 1987 in Yangon.

Works
Her best known performances with Sein Aung Min were Ngamo Yeik, Yaza Thingyan, Min Nyi Naung, Maung Missaka and Wizaya Kumma. With Aung Maung she performed Maha Paduma, Pabe Maung Tintte, Tanoyakkha and Thudhanu Medawi. She was also known for her performance of Min Kutha, Patikkhaya and Udari Kumari.

Relationship to Aung Bala
U Chan Aye and Naw Shwe Mi became close to Aung Bala during a pagoda festival in Bago. He told them that he wanted to adopt their son, Shwe Zan, and novitiate him, but died before the plan could be carried out. Many believed that he was reincarnated as their daughter, Bala Pyan.

Notes

References

External links
 Sandawgyein dance (male)
 Sandawgyein dance (female)

Burmese dancers
1914 births
1987 deaths